Wo Du hin gehst is an East German film. It was released in 1957.

Cast
 Wolfgang Stumpf: Jakob Rhode
 Gisela Trowe: Thea Ricci
 Raimund Schelcher: Albert
 Gerry Wolff: Samuel
 Johannes Knittel: René
 Josef Kamper: Lutzer
 Alexander Papendiek: Juan
 Otto Erich Edenharter: Fernando
 Heinrich Gies: Otto
 Charlotte Küter: Ottos Frau
 Hansjoachim Büttner: General Walter
 Betty Loewen: Renés Mutter
 Friedrich Richter: Dr. Wolf

External links
 

1957 films
East German films
1950s German-language films
Spanish Civil War films
1950s German films